Mariquita may refer to:

 Mariquita, Tolima, a municipality in the Tolima department of Colombia
 Mariquita Airport, an airport serving Mariquita
 Mariquita Pérez, a 1938 Spanish doll designed by Leonor Coello de Portugal

People
 Mariquita (dancer) (1830–1922), French choreographer

Given name
 Mariquita Gallegos (born 1940), Argentine singer and actress
 Mariquita Gill (1861–1915), American painter
 Mariquita Jenny Moberly (1855–1937), English artist, working in oil and watercolour
 Mariquita Sánchez (1786–1868), patriot from Buenos Aires
 Mariquita Tennant (1811–1860), Spanish-born social reformer

Characters
 Mariquita Samper, a fictional character in Giannina Braschi's Empire of Dreams (1988)

See also